Shi Dongshan (December 29, 1902 – February 23, 1955), born Shi Kuangshao, was one of the most prominent film directors and screenwriters in pre-Communist China, together with Chen Liting, Cai Chusheng, and Zheng Junli. His most notable film was Eight Thousand Li of Cloud and Moon, released in 1947. He served in the Communist government after 1949, but was later persecuted and committed suicide in 1955.

Career
Shi Dongshan was born and raised in Hangzhou, Zhejiang province. At the age of 17, he left his family and relocated to Zhangjiakou, finding brief work as a radio operator. He moved to Shanghai two years later, where he became a stage designer and occasional actor for the Shanghai Film Company (Chinese: 上海影戏公司; pinyin: Shanghai Yingxi Gongsi).

By the early 1930s, Shi was one of the leading directors for the left-leaning Lianhua Film Company, along with Cai Chusheng, Sun Yu and others. Shi would later join another left-leaning studio, Yihua Film Company, at the behest of the screenwriter Tian Han. Several years later, Shi had switched studios again. He directed several important works for the new Xinhua Film Company, notably an adaptation of the Nikolai Gogol's "The Government Inspector" entitled Night of the Debauche (1936), and the national-defense film, March of Youth (1937).

During the Second Sino-Japanese War, Shi fled to the interior of China with the Nationalist government, and directed propaganda films such as Protect Our Land (1938). After the war, Shi returned to Shanghai and helped found the Kunlun Film Company, the successor to Lianhua. It was with Kunlun that Shi directed perhaps his best known film, Eight Thousand Li of Cloud and Moon (1947). Shi would not regain the level of popularity as he would with his Kunlun films, and his final major work came after the Chinese Communist Revolution with New Heroes and Heroines (1951).

Suicide
Shi lived in Hong Kong in 1948, but went to Beijing in 1949 to work for the newly founded People's Republic of China. He was appointed head of the Technology Committee of the Film Bureau of the Ministry of Culture, but never joined the Communist Party. He became the target of political criticism by late 1951, and committed suicide on 23 February 1955. According to his son, premier Zhou Enlai ordered the confiscation of his suicide note, and news of his suicide was suppressed.

Selected filmography

Notes

References
 Pang, Laikwan. Building a New China in Cinema: The Chinese Left-Wing Cinema Movement, 1932-1937. Rowman & Littlefield, 2002. .
Xiao, Zhiwei. "Shi Dongshan" in Encyclopedia of Chinese Film, ed. by Yingjin Zhang and Zhiwei Xiao. Taylor & Francis (1998). .

External links

Shi Dongshan at the Chinese Movie Database

1902 births
1955 deaths
Film directors from Zhejiang
Writers from Hangzhou
Suicides in the People's Republic of China
Chinese film directors
Chinese silent film directors